Jonathan Koch (born 29 October 1985 in Giessen) is a German lightweight rower.

Until the end of 2010, Jonathan Koch was rowing for his hometown club Gießener Rudergesellschaft 1877. Already in summer 2010, he became part of the training group of Mainzer Ruder-Verein 1878 (MRV) under the supervision of Robert Sens, the rowing head coach of the German Federal State of Rhineland-Palatinate. Since 2011 he is officially rowing for MRV. After reaching only the B-final at the 2006 World Rowing Championships in Single Sculls he reached the A-final the following year at the World Championships in Munich, Germany, where he finished fourth. Since the Lightweight Single Sculls are not an Olympic boat class, Koch competed at the 2008 Beijing Olympics together with Manuel Brehmer in the Men's Lightweight Double Sculls where they finished ninth.

After a break in 2009 Jonathan Koch was rowing Single Sculls as well as Quadruple Sculls at the 2010 World Championships in Karapiro, NZ.  While finishing 8th in Single Sculls he became World Champion Quadruple Sculls.

At the 2011 German Championships Koch gained the title of German Champion in Single Sculls as well as Quadruple Sculls.

At the 2016 Summer Olympics in Rio de Janeiro, he competed in the men's lightweight coxless four. The German team finished in 9th place.

International results
 2005: 7th place U23-World Championships, Lightweight Single Sculls
 2006: 9th place World Championships, Lightweight Single Sculls
 2007: 4th place World Championships, Lightweight Single Sculls
 2008: 9th place Olympic Games, Lightweight Single Sculls
 2010: 1st place World Championships, Quadruple Single Sculls
 2010: 8th place World Championships, Lightweight Single Sculls
 2011: 8th place World Championships, Lightweight Single Sculls

References

External links

1985 births
Living people
Sportspeople from Giessen
Olympic rowers of Germany
Rowers at the 2008 Summer Olympics
Rowers at the 2016 Summer Olympics
World Rowing Championships medalists for Germany
German male rowers